Parachrysops is a butterfly genus in the family Lycaenidae. It is monotypic, containing only the species Parachrysops bicolor. which is endemic to New Guinea (Aroa River).

References

Luciini
Monotypic butterfly genera
Taxa named by George Thomas Bethune-Baker
Lycaenidae genera
Endemic fauna of New Guinea